The 1950 Georgia Tech Yellow Jackets football team was an American football team that represented Georgia Tech as a member of the Southeastern Conference (SEC) during the 1950 college football season. In their sixth year under head coach Bobby Dodd, the team compiled an overall record of 5–6, with a mark of 4–2 in conference play, placing fifthin the SEC.

Schedule

References

Georgia Tech
Georgia Tech Yellow Jackets football seasons
Georgia Tech Yellow Jackets football